McCarthy Building may refer to:

United States
(ordered by state)
McCarthy Building (Chicago, Illinois)
Timothy J. McCarthy Building, listed on the NRHP in Faribault, Minnesota
 McCarthy Building (Troy, New York), listed on the NRHP in Rensselaer County, New York
McCarthy-Blosser-Dillon Building, listed on the NRHP in Logan, Ohio

See also
McCarthy Power Plant, McCarthy, Alaska, listed on the NRHP in Copper River Central Area, Alaska
McCarthy General Store, McCarthy, Alaska, listed on the NRHP in Copper River Central Area, Alaska
McCarthy House (disambiguation)